Tellurium iodide may refer to:

 Tellurium monoiodide, TeI
 Tellurium tetraiodide, TeI4

Tellurium compounds
Iodides